Gervasio Gallardo (born 5 June 1934) is a Spanish artist and illustrator. He has produced numerous of surreal paintings and book covers, for many science-fiction and fantasy authors.

Biography
Born at Barcelona, Gallardo studied in Spain, working for several Spanish advertising agencies, before moving to  Munich, Germany in 1959.  The next four years he spent working for the Delpire Agency in Paris, before travelling to the United States in 1963. Here  he met Frank and Jeff Lavaty, who represent his work to this day.

In 1969, he was commissioned by Ballantine Books to create cover art for their Ballantine Adult Fantasy series. He went on to be the most prolific of their cover artists, creating a total of twenty-nine.  Since then, he has created at least eighteen covers for other authors, including producing all of the artwork for his own release: The Fantastic World of Gervasio Gallardo.
Eventually Gallardo returned to Barcelona to set up a studio. In 1977, 1978 and 1979 Gervasio Gallardo was represented at the International Art Fair of Basel by Sala Gaudí art gallery, where he exhibited individually in 1976 and 1978  and which today has a large part of his work.

Gallardo has won numerous awards within Europe and the United States, and has exhibited his work in Paris, Barcelona, and the United States.

Works
Gallardo's covers include works by: 
Peter S. Beagle
George MacDonald
Hope Mirrlees
H. P. Lovecraft
Hannes Bok
G. K. Chesterton
Lin Carter
Edmund Cooper and Roger Lancelyn Green
F. Marion Crawford
Lord Dunsany
Clark Ashton Smith
Sanders Anne Laubenthal
H. Warner Munn
William Morris

References 

Ballantine Adult Fantasy Series at Nightfall Books - Supernatural, Horror, and Fantasy Fiction Prismatrix, Inc.
Ballantine Adult Fantasy skwishmi.com
Is It Too Early for Some Grand Marnier? Mark D. Ruffner, November 5, 2010.
Gervasio Gallardo: Painting Wendy Campbell, April 16, 2010 cites The Fantastic World of Gervasio Gallardo Gervasio Gallardo, Bantam, Paperback. .

External links 
LavatyArt.com - Gervasio Gallardo Gallery

20th-century Spanish painters
20th-century Spanish male artists
Spanish male painters
Spanish surrealist artists
21st-century Spanish painters
1934 births
Living people
Fantasy artists
Catalan speculative fiction artists
21st-century Spanish male artists